National Party of Retirees and Pensioners (KPEiR) is a minor political party in Poland.

The main goal of KPEiR is protecting retired seniors, pensioners and trust-busting.

The current leader (Prezes, President in English) is former Sejm Member Tomasz Mamiński.

KPEiR was founded in 1994. However, party lost the parliamentary election in 1997 winning just 284 826 votes (2.18%) and no seat in Sejm and Senate.

During municipal elections of 1998 KPEiR, allied with Democratic Left Alliance (SLD), Polish People's Party (PSL) and Labor Union (UP) won some seats.

During the 2001 parliamentary election KPEiR run in coalition with SLD, UP and Democratic Party. Coalition won the election in landslide and SLD/UP formed government together with PSL. Tomasz Mamiński, party leader, had won a Sejm seat in Warsaw.

However, Mamiński was expelled from Parliamentary club of SLD after scandal in Sejm restaurant. Then he joined Federacyjny Klub Parlamentarny, which included various Sejm members from various parties.

Party did not run in 2005 and 2007 parliamentary election and didn't endorsed any other list. Their future is unclear.

References

External links
Official site

1994 establishments in Poland
Political parties established in 1994
Political parties in Poland
Social democratic parties in Poland